The Encyclopedia of World Problems and Human Potential is published by the Union of International Associations (UIA). It is available online since 2000, and was previously available as a CD-ROM and as a three-volume book.

The Encyclopedia was started under the direction of Anthony Judge in 1972 and now comprises more than 100,000 entries and 700,000 links, as well as hundreds of pages of introductory notes and commentaries. The Encyclopedia collects information on problems, strategies, values, concepts of human development, and various intellectual resources.

Databases 
The Encyclopedia of World Problems and Human Potential is made up from data gathered from many sources. Those data are grouped into various databases which constitute the backbone of the Encyclopedia. The databases are searchable; query results may be seen as lists or as various visualizations. They include:

 World Problems – Issues is a database with almost 57 thousand entries.
• Basic universal problems include danger, lack of information, social injustice, war, environmental degradation. 
• Cross-sectoral problems include animal suffering, irresponsible nationalism, soil degradation. 
• Detailed problems include detention of mothers, epidemics, white-collar crime.
• Emanations of other problems include terrorism targeted against tourists, injustice of mass trials, threatened species of Caudata.  
• Fuzzy exceptional problems include blaming victims, pacifism, unconstrained free trade.
• Very specific problems include blue baby, tomato mottle virus, costly uniforms.
• Problems under consideration include feminist backlash, mudslide.
• Suspect problems include threatened species of Zapus hudsonius preblei, uncommitted volunteer workers.

 Global Strategies – Solutions is a database with over 32 thousand entries.
• Abstract fundamental strategies include compromising, transcending, providing.
• Basic universal strategies include eliminating discrimination, combating desertification, reducing unemployment.
• Cross-sectoral strategies include orienting economic policy toward social need, managing crises. 
• Detailed strategies include establishing national government NGO departments, using psychological warfare. 
• Emanations of other strategies include lifting restrictions on human rights advocacy, reviewing provisions of the UN Charter.  
• Exceptional strategies include begging, rechanneling expenditures on defence, advocating nihilism.
• Very specific strategies include working with young people, undertaking public works.  
• Unconfirmed strategies include abolishing zoos, ventilating air through buildings. 
• Provisional strategies include developing chest radiology, preserving internal political borders.  
• Strategy polarities include deepening-shallowing, intuiting-reasoning, supporting-opposing.  
• Strategy roles include advisor, traitor, confessor.
• Strategy types or complexes include communication, judgement, time.

 Human Values is a database with over 3,200 entries.
• Constructive values include peace, harmony, beauty.    
• Destructive values include conflict, depravity, ugliness.
• Value polarities include agreement-disagreement, freedom-restraint, pleasure-displeasure. 
• Value clusters include feeling complex, interaction complex, communication complex.

  Human Development is a database with over 4,800 entries.
• Concepts of human development include vocational training, benevolence, emancipation of the self.
• Modes of awareness include compassion, sense of shame, conviction, sense of humor.

  Patterns and Metaphors is a database with almost 1,300 entries.
• Communication: Forms of presentation include animation, statistical indicators, prophecy.  
• Metaphors include ball games, sexual intercourse, personification, stick and carrot processes.
• Patterns (Christopher Alexander) include encirclement, internal connectedness between domains, partially isolated contexts.
• Symbols include birds, food-related objects, sacred calendar.
• Transformative conferencing includes aggressive participant type, lecture, team roles.
• Transformative metaphors (I Ching) include creativity, receptivity, inexperience. 

  Integrative Concepts is a database with over 630 entries. Entries include design, meta-language, science policy.
  Network Visualizations is a database featuring a collection of documents added from 2001 to the present.
  Bibliography (issues) is a database with 16,000+ entries and 24,000+ links.

Entries and links 
The Encyclopedia online databases consist of over 100,000 entries (also called profiles) and 700,000 links. An entry, for instance War, may include the following elements:
1) name, alternative names, nature or definition, background or context, incidence (for problems) or implementation (for strategies), claim of importance, counter-claim, quotations or aphorisms (for values);
2) links to the same database entries that are more general (broader), more specific (narrower), related (in some as yet unspecified manner), preceding (aggravating or reducing problems, constraining or facilitating strategies, prior modes of awareness), following (aggravated or reduced problems, constrained or facilitated strategies, subsequent modes of awareness);
3) cross-reference links, mainly between entries in the Problems, Strategies, Values, and Development databases;
4) links to entries in other UIA databases, mainly the International Organizations database;
5) reference links to entries in the Bibliography (issues) database;
6) links to relevant websites.

Notes and commentaries 
The Encyclopedia of World Problems and Human Potential contains nearly 500 pages of introductory notes and commentaries. Some of them just provide readers with usual information about the work content and its organization. Most of them represent extensive reports on the exploratory work done by the editors in eight projects (also called research areas, or sections). Here are those projects, with illustrative examples of key ideas figuring in the notes and commentaries.

Encyclopedia of world problems and human potential project 
A first objective of the editors in that project is to collect and present information on the following topics: the problems with which humanity perceives itself to be faced; the organizational, human, and intellectual resources it believes it has at its disposal; the values by which it is believed any change should be guided; the concepts of human development considered to be either the means or the end of any such social transformation. A second objective is to clarify the conceptual challenge of interrelating such plentiful and disparate or even contradictory information. A third objective is to enable alternation between viewpoints from different cultures, ideologies, beliefs and even "facts", as a way for individuals and societies to become empowered with an appropriate response to the problematic conditions of the moment.

It is the disagreement amongst the advocates of different approaches to problems or solutions which hinders the formation of any consensual strategy and the mobilization of adequate resources. That is why the Encyclopedia uses an approach that is as general and minimally structured as is feasible without losing coherence and utility. The intent is first to contribute to clarify the nature, extent, and interrelationships of problems and solutions. Even the distinction between problems and solutions is not always clear. For instance, housing an increasing number of people is a solution that may aggravate the problem of urban overcrowding, and the death of individuals is a problem that contributes to the solution of reducing ecological impact of overpopulation.

The Encyclopedia databases are much about how problems, strategies, values, development concepts, and organizations are linked together. As a result, the possibility of focusing on feedback loops has proven to be an important feature of the Encyclopedia, and a program has been carried out to identify "vicious problem loops". A vicious problem loop is a chain of problems, each aggravating the next, and with the last looping back to aggravate the first in the chain.  Here is an example: Man-made disasters, Vulnerability of ecosystem niches, Natural environment degradation, Shortage of natural resources, Unbridled competition for scarce resources, Man-made disasters. Solutions that focus on only one problem in a chain may fail or even be harmful, because the cycle has the capacity to regenerate itself, and also because several cycles may interlock, forming tangled skeins of interlinked global problems. The loop detection program detected more than 50,000 loops (of up to 9 elements) in more than 12,000 problem profiles. It is thought that a similar work could be done about mutually facilitating or constraining strategy loops, so as to constitute a dynamic response to aggravating or reducing loops of problems through a circle of matching strategies.

World problems and global issues 
That project endeavors to present all the phenomena in society that are perceived negatively by groups transcending national frontiers. Those phenomena constitute a challenge to creative remedial action. Groups are strongly motivated by the problems that infringe their values and arouse their indignation. As such, problems are a major stimulus driving the development of society. Although there is agreement that problems are numerous and that many are really serious, little effort has been made to determine how many problems there are. Likewise, while it is becoming increasingly evident that problems interact with one another, and constitute complex networks or systems, little effort has been made to map that complexity. The perceptions documented in that project raise useful questions concerning the nature and existence of problems, especially when other groups consider that one perception or another is irrelevant, misleading or misinformed. An aim of that research area, then, is to assemble information whose significance is collectively repressed, displaced onto some less threatening problems, or projected in the form of blame onto some other social group.

Views concerning problems are extremely varied. Several pages in the notes and commentaries deal with that variety. Problems are agenda items for assemblies or conferences; action targets for organizations; issues for political parties or governments; events or topics for the media; markets for businesses; sins for religions; puzzles for sciences. Problems can be viewed as synonymous with chaos and disorder, or as elements in an ordered array; as static or dynamic entities; as discrete or continuous phenomena; as objective things or subjective experiences; as directly experienceable phenomena or as indirect implications of seemingly innocent phenomena; as inherently comprehensible or incomprehensible entities; as the results of due processes or as spontaneous phenomena. For many people in the West problems may be considered as artifacts of concerned minds, about which reason, principles, or history are relevant, while in the East to conceive of life as presenting problems to be solved may be seen as a misconception of life. Other pages of notes and commentaries deal extensively with the variety of points of view under headings such as Approaches to problems, Beyond the problem-lobby mindset, or Problem perception and levels of awareness.

Global strategies and solutions 
That project aims at identifying the complete range of strategies perceived by constituencies acting at the international level.

The conventional way of addressing any problem situation is to elaborate a strategy, but given the number, variety and interrelationships of the problems, it is uncertain whether any conventional strategy could be adequate. In general, many groups have "answers" to the current crisis. The proponents of each such answer naturally attach special importance to their own as being of crucial relevance at this time, or even as being the only appropriate basis for a viable world society in the future. That focus on "answer production", a vital moving force in society, obscures the manner in which such answers, in the absence of integration between them, undermine each other's significance.

It appears to the editors that the elements of the strategic challenge at this time include:
a vast and changing network of perceived problems, on which no single body has (or possibly could have) adequate control;
a vast and changing network of conceptual tools and knowledge resources, which is not (and possibly could not be) controlled by any single body;
a vast and changing network of agencies, organizations, groups and active individuals spanning every conceivable human interest and extending from the community level to the international level, and on which no single body has (or possibly could or should have) adequate control.
The strategic problem therefore is how to ensure that the appropriate organizational resources emerge, and are supported with appropriate conceptual tools, in response to emerging problem complexes. But it would seem that this must be achieved without organizing such response – for to the extent that any part of the network is organized, other parts will develop (and probably should develop) which favor alternative approaches. The challenge is therefore to clarify the conditions of a network strategy, i.e. an approach which facilitates or catalyses (rather than organizes) the development of organizational networks in response to problem networks, in the light of values perceived in various parts of the social system.

Many pages of notes and commentaries describe in details various approaches to global strategies, and their limits. Such are Strategic ecosystem: beyond "The Plan", Governance (a series of pages on reports from the Club of Rome, the Commission on Global Governance, and four others groups), Strategic denial: action inhibition, Post-crisis opportunities: range of strategies, and Post-crisis opportunities: strategies in chaos. A long series of pages explores how to "move beyond the unimodal answer and recognize that because each form of action has both strengths and weaknesses, the key to a more effectively multimodal answer lies in finding how to interrelate the various unimodal answers so that they correct for each others weaknesses and counteract each others excesses". But, it must also be asked, is integrated action of any type feasible at this time? The exploration begins with Strategic appropriateness: questionable answers, and finishes with Action implications: consensus, uncertainty and action formulation. Conditions for progress in strategy-making are more explicitly brought up in pages such as Strategic ecosystem: integrating constraint and opposition, and Post-crisis opportunities: in quest of radical coherence.

Human values and wisdom 
That project aims at registering a complete range of values with which people identify, to which they are attracted or which they reject as abhorrent. The notion of wisdom is explored as a way, an art, of dealing with value dilemmas. For instance, Complexity: understanding value systems is a text that looks at values through a positive interpretation, a negative interpretation, a paradoxical negative interpretation of the positive, and a paradoxical positive interpretation of the negative. Another text, Insights: wisdom and requisite variety, gives a list of several sources of wisdom which, in interrelation, may be required in a value system to ensure the long-term viability of a complex society.

Human potential and development 
The purpose of that project is to provide profiles of human development approaches and modes of awareness, and their relationships, as perceived by different beliefs systems, disciplines, religions, and cultures. Much of the material in this section is about the limitations of language in expressing levels of significance beyond that which can be effectively captured by words, so that, seemingly, what we need to understand may only be expressible in a "language" that we do not know! That paradox is explored in a page entitled Language and the reconstruction of reality. Other challenges relative to human potential and development are explored in pages such as Phases of human development through challenging problems, or Barriers to transcendent insight and social transformation.

Patterns and metaphors 
The purpose of that project is to review the range of communication possibilities of metaphor, pattern and symbol. New conceptual tools are required to configure very large quantities of information into patterns that are both memorable and meaningful, and metaphor is often the only means to deal comprehensibly with complexity. Moreover, exploring "new ways of thinking" in the light of enhanced mental imagery (or mental model) appears indispensable inasmuch as furthering "mobilization of public opinion" and the "political will to change" is dependent upon insights that are too complex to be easily communicable. For instance, limitations of dualistic thinking are well-known and holistic approaches may represent more desirable alternatives, but how is it possible to implement such alternatives? The page Challenge: transcending the "switch" metaphor deals with that question.

Integrative knowledge and transdisciplinarity 
The purpose of that project is to assemble descriptions of the range of conceptual approaches which are considered integrative and which are held by some international constituencies to provide a key for strategic response to the global problematique. Buzzwords like "global", "networking" and "systematic" are often used as magical "words-of-power". Nevertheless, in a society characterized by specialization, fragmentation, disparateness, or opposition, integrative approaches until now have proved inadequate or too difficult to implement. In order to go beyond that difficulty, it seems necessary to creatively introduce novelties, such as a science or art of disagreement that could clarify how to disagree intelligently rather than do so in a mindless manner requiring some form of violent or repressive reaction to eliminate the disagreement as soon as possible. There is a wide variety of initiatives pertaining to integrative knowledge and transdisciplinarity, and a page like Significance: previous, parallel or related initiatives presents several of them. With regard to interdisciplinary relationships between organizations, problems, strategies, values and human development, there is the Integrative Matrix of Human Preoccupations which has been developed by the editors and which allows to deal with all those elements in an exploratory fashion.

Transformative approaches to social organization 
The purpose of that project is to provide a context for the presentation of new approaches to the challenges highlighted in the other projects. The emphasis is on configuring information in new ways, through a variety of accessible techniques, so as to allow easier navigation through complexity, and so as to evoke imaginative insights in response to such complexity. The Overview page presents about forty of those approaches or techniques, including interactive database use, q-analysis, information visualization, confidence artistry, tensegrity organization, I Ching, transformative conferencing, or marriage between poetry and policy-making.

Contributors 
The project was originally conceived in 1972 by James Wellesley-Wesley, who provided financial support through the foundation Mankind 2000, and Anthony Judge, by whom the work was orchestrated.

Work on the first edition started with funds from Mankind 2000, matching those of the UIA. The publisher Klaus Saur, of Munich, provided funds, in conjunction with those from the UIA, for work on the 2nd, 3rd, and 4th editions. Seed funding for the third volume of the 4th edition was also provided on behalf of Mankind 2000. In the nineties, seed funding was provided, again on behalf of Mankind 2000, for computer equipment which subsequently allowed the UIA to develop a large website and make progressively available for free the Encyclopedia databases as from the 1994–1995 edition. In turn, this proven knowledge management capacity enabled the UIA, on the initiative of Nadia McLaren, a consultant ecologist who has been a primary editor for the Encyclopedia, to successfully instigate two multi-partner projects funded by the European Union, with matching funds from the UIA. The work done through those two projects, Ecolynx: Information Context for Biodiversity Conservation (mainly) and Interactive Health Ecology Access Links, eventually resulted in what amounted to a fifth, web-based, edition of the Encyclopedia in 2000. In their own ways, two other persons in particular effectively supported the project over the years: Robert Jungk of Mankind 2000, and Christian de Laet of the UIA.

The Encyclopedia was the fruit of a continuing processing of documents gathered from many of the thousands of the international organizations profiled in the Yearbook of International Organizations. Many such bodies regularly produce a wide range of material on the areas of their concern, many regularly send documents to the UIA, and many, when requested more specifically, supplied documents for the Encyclopedia. The following organizations provided documents in the greatest quantity: FAO, ILO, UNICEF, UNESCO, UNCTD, WHO, Commonwealth Secretariat, Council of Europe, OECD, World Bank group. Furthermore, the United Nations Library in Geneva facilitated access to other material over two decades. The Institute of Cultural Affairs International was contractually associated at one point to the edition and other aspects of the Encyclopedia project. The Goals, Processes and Indicators of Development project (led by Johan Galtung) of the United Nations University, in which Anthony Judge participated on behalf of the UIA between 1978 and 1982, was an experience of learning and research that had a significant impact on the editorial content of the Encyclopedia. Another noticeable influence came from futures studies, with which Judge has long been associated. He reports in Encyclopedia Illusions how the narrow focus of the Club of Rome on a few socio-economic aspects of futures research prompted the much vaster exploration concerning world problems and human potential.

Anthony Judge was the architect and managing editor of the Encyclopedia. He was also the main author of the notes and commentaries. The principal editors over the years have been, for different editions, Jon Jenkins and Maureen Jenkins (who had also worked at the Institute of Cultural Affairs), Owen Victor, Jacqueline Nebel, Nadia McLaren, and Tomáš Fülöpp. There were also enthusiastic editorial contributions from volunteers. All people related to the UIA who worked directly on one or more of the five Encyclopedia editions figure on a list that can be found online under the heading Associates of the Union of Intelligible Associations. This is because in 2005, following disagreement over the partnership contract, Anthony Judge, as Executive Secretary of Mankind 2000, reframed the Encyclopedia as having been a strategic initiative of the Union of Intelligible Associations.
Tomáš Fülöpp continued maintaining and improving Encyclopedia databases at the UIA until January 2012. In the years after, on a contractual basis, he has been architecting a number of data structure, editing system, API, and visualization enhancements. Tomáš Fülöpp also continues to manage and lead the Encyclopedia project in close collaboration with the UIA and a group of senior editors such as Nadia McLaren and Kimberly Trathen.

Editions 
 The 1st edition, initiated in 1972 and published in 1976, has one volume entitled Yearbook of World Problems and Human Potential, comprising thirteen sections, several of which have not appeared in subsequent editions.
 The 2nd edition, initiated in 1983 and published in 1986, has the new definitive title Encyclopedia of World Problems and Human Potential. It is still a single volume (published, this time only, as volume 4 of the Yearbook of International Organizations), but it has a different set of sections, and because it is printed on thin paper with a special world award-winning typesetting, the book is equivalent to several normal volumes. 
 
 The 3rd edition, initiated in 1988 and published in 1991, has two volumes: World Problems (vol. 1), and Human Potential (vol. 2). 
 The 4th edition, initiated in 1992 and published in 1994–1995, has three volumes: World Problems (vol. 1), Human Potential – Transformation and Values (vol.2), Actions – Strategies – Solutions (vol. 3). A CD-ROM version, Encyclopedia Plus, is also published.
 The online edition, initiated in 1997 and completed in 2000, is freely available. It may be noted that a gigantic "Questions database" was added in 2006, but removed shortly after to reduce server burden. For the future, it can be seen on the UIA website that a participative and interactive process is in place, which might allow eventually, in accordance with the often expressed intentions of the editors, to develop the online Encyclopedia in a continuous manner.

Here is a table showing the number of entries for certain topics in the various editions.

Reviews 
There have been several reviews of the encyclopedia. One of the harshest criticisms came from the American Library Association in 1987: "The board considers the Encyclopedia of World Problems and Human Potential a problematic monument to idiosyncrasy, confusion, and obfuscation that certainly is not worth purchasing at any price." Similarly, The Guardian was extremely critical in a review article published in 1992, to which Anthony Judge recently responded via Transcend Media Service on the occasion of the publication in The Wall Street Journal of a page-one sympathetic review of the Encyclopedia initiative, in December 2012. The work itself is keen on presenting, in various places, disclaimers, reservations or warning texts that anticipate criticisms and explain the strengths and weaknesses of its approaches, including the failure to advocate a position, or the sometimes excessive complexity in its methods or language.

Most reviews are laudatory. Richard Slaughter emphasized that the significance of the work is not its size or the scope of its references, impressive though these are. It is rather in the nature of what has been attempted. The accompanying notes and commentaries, he said, are good enough to be published separately because they contain highly cogent observations on the "global problematique", commentaries on the work of numerous great thinkers from a wide variety of fields, and an impressive array of insights about the epistemology, symbolism, metaphysics, metaphors and linguistic representations of the subject. As far as practice is concerned, the highest commendation perhaps is to be found in the words of Elise Boulding: "Any one of us (...) can actively become a part in the world problem solving process by using this encyclopedia."

See also 
Decision making
Environmental issue
Global governance
Policy
Political issue
Problem solving
Public policy
Social issue
Wicked problem

References

External links
 Encyclopedia of World Problems and Human Potential (main database)
 Encyclopedia of World Problems and Human Potential (editing platform)
 Encyclopedia of World Problems and Human Potential (project information)
 Ecolynx - A short movie exemplifying the use of the Encyclopedia
 Encyclopedia of World Problems Has a Big One of Its Own, a Wall Street Journal article, 11 December 2012.

 Union of International Associations

Online encyclopedias
Online databases
Public policy
Social issues
Economic problems
Problem solving
Global issues
Human development